Hamish Bowles (born 23 July 1963) is an English fashion journalist and editor. He is Vogue magazine's global editor at large. On 17 September 2021, Hamish was also named the new editor in chief at The World of Interiors, a Condé Nast interior design magazine. In addition to his editorial roles, Bowles has hosted the podcasts In Vogue: The 1990s and In Vogue: The 2000s. He also narrates Vogue’s popular YouTube series Everything You Need to Know.

Background
Hamish Bowles was born in London in 1963, the son of David Victor Bowles, vice-provost of University College, London, and his wife Anne, a photographer. He studied at Saint Martin's School of Art.

Career
From 1984 until 1992, he worked for Harper's Bazaar UK, first as a fashion editor, then as fashion director and, from 1989, as style director. In 1992, Bowles joined the staff of the American edition of Vogue.

In 1998 he had a cameo part in Love Is the Devil: Study for a Portrait of Francis Bacon as a young David Hockney. In 2006 he appeared for some seconds in Sofia Coppola's Marie Antoinette as a courtier. He appeared in 2009 in Valentino: The Last Emperor and in 2010 in Gossip Girl and in Wall Street: Money Never Sleeps.

Bowles has a large personal collection of designer clothing, including pieces by John Galliano, Mainbocher and Charles Frederick Worth. He has lent items from his collection to exhibitions at the Metropolitan Museum of Art. He served as a creative consultant for an exhibition at the MET featuring the iconic fashion worn by Jacqueline Kennedy Onassis during her White House years. A book he edited was published to coincide with and accompany the exhibition.

At Vogue, Bowles was featured in a video series titled "Vintage Bowles" where cameras followed him as he shopped for clothes around the world.

In 2022, Bowles co-hosted the Met Gala alongside Vanessa Hudgens and Blake Lively.

References

1963 births
Living people
English fashion journalists
Vogue (magazine) people
Alumni of Saint Martin's School of Art